Virginia Hunter (née Reed; February 17, 1920 – March 23, 2012) was an American model and actress. She appeared in over 20 films during the 1940s.

Early years
Hunter was the daughter of Freeman A. Reed. Hunter grew up in Tulsa, Oklahoma, before her family moved to Los Angeles in 1940.

Career
Hunter signed with Columbia Pictures. At Columbia, she performed in the Jack Cole Dance group before acting in films. She quickly became known to matinee audiences at the time for co-starring in four of the Durango Kid films. She also has a supporting role in The Mating of Millie, starring Glenn Ford and Evelyn Keyes.

To modern viewers, Hunter is known for her roles in several Three Stooges films from the Shemp Howard era, specifically Sing a Song of Six Pants, I'm a Monkey's Uncle (and its remake Stone Age Romeos) and Fiddlers Three (and its remake Musty Musketeers).

Later years
After her time with Columbia, Hunter worked as a model and a store manager. After retirement, she lived with her older brother in Las Vegas.

Personal life and death 
On November 2, 1952, Hunter married to Henry "Mac" Hunter, a golfer. They were divorced on February 8, 1954. She died on March 23, 2012, in Hemet, California at age 92.

References

External links

Virginia Hunter at threestooges.net

1920 births
Place of death missing
2012 deaths
People from Springfield, Missouri
American film actresses
21st-century American women